Tegna may refer to:

Tegna, Switzerland,  a former municipality in the district of Locarno
Tegna Inc., an American broadcast, digital media and marketing services company

See also
 Tenga (disambiguation)